Neptis metanira, or Holland's sailer, is a butterfly in the family Nymphalidae. It is found in Ghana, Nigeria, Cameroon, Gabon, the Republic of the Congo and possibly the Democratic Republic of the Congo and Uganda. The habitat consists of forests.

References

Butterflies described in 1892
metanira
Butterflies of Africa